Maestro Harrell, also known as M A E S T R O (born July 29, 1991), is an American DJ, singer, rapper, actor, and record producer. He starred on the HBO original series The Wire as Randy Wagstaff (2006–08), and as Malik on the ABC comedy Suburgatory.

Early life and career
Harrell was born in Chicago, Illinois. He was the recipient of The Most Talented Child Under Twelve Years Old at the Chicago Music Awards in 1999, 2000, and 2001. In 2005, Harrell performed at the grand opening ceremony for Disneyland in Hong Kong. He signed a recording deal with So So Def/Island Def Jam with hip-hop producer Jermaine Dupri.

Starting at the age of 7, Harrell made multiple appearances on TV shows like The Tonight Show with Jay Leno and The Maury Povich -Most Talented Kids Show and other television shows; serving as the spokesperson for Western Union's Study Buddy Reading Program which enabled him to travel around the United States performing at schools and delivering motivational speeches to encourage students to read, as well as singing numerous jingles. He is a member of SAG, AFTRA and EQUITY unions. In addition to his lead role in Sony TriStar's Guys Like Us, Harrell has appeared in several television commercials.

Harrell made his motion picture film debut in the movie Ali, which was directed by Michael Mann. He portrayed the young Cassius Clay, and the all-star cast included Will Smith, Jamie Foxx and Jon Voight. He was in Barbershop and the film The Promotion. He remains best known for his role in David Simon's The Wire as Randy Wagstaff.

His voice is featured on the Twilight Zone episodes CD, along with Blair Underwood. Harrell starred in ABC's production of the PGA Tour Western Open with Tiger Woods and other pro-golfers. In 2003, Maestro was selected to play Young Simba in the Chicago production of Disney's The Lion King.

Harrell had a recurring role as Malik LeFrique on the ABC sitcom Suburgatory, which ran from 2011–14.

In 2011, he started producing. His first record was a remix to DJ Ruckus' single "Soul Soldier". 2014 he officially started a career as a music producer and dj. His first solo single developed as a collaboration with Antoine Becks, who has a career as an actor behind him too. "Drop It" contains many characteristics of the big-room-genre, which was very popular to that point of time. "Drop It" was the title and it was signed to German edm-label "Kontor Records".

In 2015, Maestro was cast to the role of Matt Sale in AMC's Fear The Walking Dead.

His break through in the edm scene was finally done in 2015 with the progressive-house track "For You", a collaboration with Dzeko & Torres and singer-duo Delora. Later in 2015 he was signed to W&W's label "Mainstage Music", where he got much attention for his track "Olympus" as well as his collaboration "Poseidon" with Maurice West. One year later he changed his style with a jungle-terror-crossover track called "Zantar", which was produced together with newcomer NoTech.

In early 2018, Maestro released his self-produced track "Which One Which" which would later be featured in The First Purge. A week later, he released a follow-up track titled "Woke up". Later that year, M A E S T R O released his self-produced debut EP WAV GOD.

Harrell's track with David Gemmill Crystals was featured in the animated superhero musical-comedy film Teen Titans Go! To the Movies later that year.

In September 2019, M A E S T R O released a follow-up to his debut EP titled "WAV GOD 2".

Filmography

Discography

Album 
2018:

 WAV GOD - EP

2019:

 WAV GOD VOL. 2

Singles 
2014:

 Drop It (with Antoine Becks)

2015:

 For You (with Dzeko & Torres featuring Delora)(Club Life, Vol. 4 - New York City)
 Higher (with Antoine Becks featuring Sherry St. Germain)
 Olympus

2016:

 Boa (with Arcando)
 True (featuring Posso)
 Poseidon (with Maurice West)
 Siren
 Zantar (with NoTech)

2017:

 Pandemik
 Hear Me
 I Don't Care
 Luv Me (featuring Alyxx Dione)
 What U Wanna
 We Rage (DJ Ruckus, Maestro Harrell, Jermaine Dupri)

2018:

 6Figga
 She Wanna (ft. Rich The Kid)
 Woke Up
 Which One Which
 Crystals (David Gemmill & M A E S T R O)
 Symphony (with Olly James)

2019:
 Stay FLYY
 2 For 1
 IN MY BAG
 U & I
 MILLION
 MAD AT U
 LOOKING GOOD
 SOUL FOOD (Maestro Harrell, M A E S T R O)
 HYDE PARK (Maestro Harrell, M A E S T R O)
 MIDWAY (Maestro Harrell, M A E S T R O)

2020:

 Quarantine (Maestro Harrell, M A E S T R O)

Remixes 
2011:

 DJ Ruckus featuring Mannequim - Soul Soldier (Maestro Harrell Remix)

2015:

 A&G and Northmark featuring Gabrielle Ross - Run With Me (Maestro Harrell Remix)

2016:

 Tiësto vs. Diplo - C'mon (Maestro Harrell 2016 Remix)

2017:

 Dash Berlin feat. Do - Heaven (Maestro Harrell Remix)

References

External links
 
 
 
 
 

Morgan Park Academy alumni
Male actors from Chicago
African-American male actors
American male child actors
American male television actors
Living people
Singers from Chicago
20th-century American male actors
21st-century American male actors
20th-century American singers
21st-century American singers
Progressive house musicians
20th-century American male singers
21st-century American male singers
1991 births
20th-century African-American male singers
21st-century African-American male singers